Burusu is an Austronesian language of Indonesian Borneo.

References

Languages of North Kalimantan
Endangered Austronesian languages
Murutic languages